Theasinensin G is polyphenol flavonoid found in oolong tea.

It is a deoxy derivative of theasinensin D and atropisomer of theasinensin F.

References 

 
 

Flavanols
Polyphenols
Biphenyls